Bruno Jesi (11 January 1916, in Udine – 11 January 1943, in Turin) was an Italian military man. Descended from an ancient family of Jewish rabbis and father of the Italian historian, writer, archaeologist and philosopher Furio Jesi, he was a cavalry officer awarded of the Gold Medal of Military Valor for particular heroism.

Jesi volunteered in the Second Italo-Ethiopian War as a Blackshirt and was later involved in police operations in the colony as a second lieutenant of cavalry. He participated in numerous military actions, which earned him several decorations for bravery and crippled his right leg. Because of his Jewish origin, he was first dismissed and discriminated, only to be Aryanized for exceptional merit following the concession of the Gold Medal. He died at the age of twenty-seven as a result of his injuries. In the town of Ruda, Friuli, a military cantonment assigned to the 33rd Infantry Battalion ARDENZA bears his name. Jesi developed a strong critical sense towards fascism later in life, and was part of the Jewish Community Council in Rome.

References

Bibliography
 Giovanni Cecini, I soldati ebrei di Mussolini. Mursia: Milano, 2008. Print.

External links 
I soldati ebrei di Mussolini - Giovanni Cecini - parte 1
 http://www.albertoparducci.it/photo_gallery/Image126.jpg
Young Italian Jewish Army Officer Wins Rare Award for Bravery, Jewish Telegraphic Agency (1939)

1916 births
1943 deaths
20th-century Italian Jews
Italian military personnel killed in World War II
Recipients of the Gold Medal of Military Valor
People from Udine